The 1987 Dartmouth Big Green football team was an American football team that represented Dartmouth College during the 1987 NCAA Division I-AA football season. Dartmouth finished second-to-last in the Ivy League.

In their first season under head coach Eugene "Buddy" Teevens, the Big Green compiled a 2–8 record and were outscored 302 to 113. Matthew Drury and Brett Matthews were the team captains.

The Big Green's 1–6 conference record placed seventh in the Ivy League standings. Dartmouth was outscored 192 to 46 by Ivy opponents. The team's only league win was a two-point victory over Columbia, a team in the midst of a five-year losing streak.

Dartmouth played its home games at Memorial Field on the college campus in Hanover, New Hampshire.

Schedule

References

Dartmouth
Dartmouth Big Green football seasons
Dartmouth Big Green football